Nevada historical markers identify significant places of interest in Nevada's history. The Historic Marker Program was initiated by the Nevada State Legislature in 1967 to bring the state's heritage to the public's attention with on-site markers. Because of budget cuts the program became dormant in 2009.

Notes

Markers
Nevada
Historical markers
Historical markers
Historical markers